Sonorella grahamensis is a species of air-breathing land snail, a terrestrial pulmonate gastropod mollusk in the subfamily Helminthoglyptinae. This species is endemic to the United States.

References

Molluscs of the United States
Sonorella
Gastropods described in 1919
Taxonomy articles created by Polbot